Kaarlo Aleksanteri (Aleksander) Heiskanen (28 October 1894 in Joroinen – 6 November 1962 in Hämeenlinna) was a Finnish general and Knight of the Mannerheim Cross. He was the Chief of Defence of the Finnish Defence Forces between 1953 and 1959.

External links

The Finnish Defence Forces: Chiefs of Defence 

1894 births
1962 deaths
People from Joroinen
People from Mikkeli Province (Grand Duchy of Finland)
Chiefs of Staff (Finnish Defence Forces)
Finnish generals
German military personnel of World War I
People of the Finnish Civil War (White side)
Finnish military personnel of World War II
Knights of the Mannerheim Cross
1962 suicides
Suicides by firearm in Finland